Symmoca italica is a moth of the family Autostichidae. It is found in Italy.

References

Moths described in 1962
Symmoca
Moths of Europe